The Swan Stakes (Japanese スワンステークス) is a Grade 2 horse race for Thoroughbreds aged three and over run in October over a distance of 1,400 metres at Kyoto Racecourse.

It was first run in 1958 and was promoted to Grade 2 in 1984 when its distance was reduced from 1600 metres.

Winners since 2000 

The 2021 and 2022 runnings took place at Hanshin while Kyoto was closed for redevelopment.

Earlier winners

 1984 - Nihon Pillow Winner
 1985 - Korin O
 1986 - Nippon Teio
 1987 - Pot Tesco Lady
 1988 - Shin Wind
 1989 - Bamboo Memory
 1990 - Narcisse Noir
 1991 - K S Miracle
 1992 - Dictar Girl
 1993 - Shinko Lovely
 1994 - Sakura Bakushin O
 1995 - Hishi Akebono
 1996 - Sugino Hayakaze
 1997 - Taiki Shuttle
 1998 - Royal Suzuka
 1999 - Black Hawk

See also
 Horse racing in Japan
 List of Japanese flat horse races

References

Turf races in Japan